Stefan Mitrović (born 15 August 2002) is a Serbian professional footballer who plays as a 
winger for Red Star Belgrade in the Serbian SuperLiga.

Early life
Mitrović was born in Kruševac, Serbia, FR Yugoslavia and moved to Hamilton, Ontario, Canada when he was six months old.

Mitrović played for a number of youth teams academies in Ontario, including Hamilton Serbians, Givova Academy, Hamilton United, Empire Niagara Academy, and Toronto FC.

Career

Early career
In November 2018, Mitrović took part in the Canadian Premier League open tryouts, but was not approached by any club. In 2018 and 2019, he played with Hamilton City 1 in the Canadian Soccer League.

Radnički Niš
Mitrović made his professional debut on November 23, 2019, with Radnički Niš, replacing Nikola Čumić in the 88th minute in a 2–0 defeat to Red Star Belgrade. Mitrović earned his first professional start on May 30, 2020, in a 1–1 draw to Napredak Kruševac, and scored his first goal on June 8 in a 4–3 victory over Radnik Surdulica. In March 2022, Radnički Niš announced Mitrović  had signed a two-year contract extension.

Red Star
On July 18, 2022, Mitrović joined Red Star Belgrade on a transfer, after Red Star paid the €500,000 release clause in his contract with Radnički Niš.

As a "bonus" player, Mitrovic managed to secure significant minutes in Serbian Superliga and even UEFA Europa League. 

Halfway through season 2022/23, in 25 appearances, Mitrović scored 5 goals and managed to get 3 assists in all competition.

The most significant goal, he scored against Ferencvaroš at "Groupama arena" in Red Star loss (2:1) in 4th round of group H.

International career
He was eligible to play for Canada and Serbia, in June 2020 Mitrović revealed he was in contact with the Canadian U20 team and in the process of obtaining a Serbian passport.

In August 2021, Mitrović was called up to the Serbia U-20 team for a friendly against Italy. He made an appearance in the match on September 6 as a second-half substitute. In November 2021, Mitrović accepted a call-up to the Serbia U-21 side and on November 16 in the match against Ukraine, he scored a goal in a 2–1 defeat.

In December 2021, Mitrović confirmed he had accepted a call-up from Canada for their January 2022 camp, however the camp was cancelled due to COVID-19 concerns.

Mitrović chose to represent the senior Serbia national football team and debuted in a UEFA Nations League match against Sweden, on 24 September 2022.

Statistics

Club

International

References

External links

2002 births
Living people
Sportspeople from Kruševac
Soccer people from Ontario
Serbian footballers
Serbia international footballers
Serbia under-21 international footballers
Canadian soccer players
Serbian emigrants to Canada
Association football midfielders
Hamilton City SC players
FK Radnički Niš players
Red Star Belgrade footballers
Serbian First League players
Serbian SuperLiga players
Canadian Soccer League (1998–present) players